Nicholas Mike-Mayer (MICK-uh-myur) (born March 1, 1950) is a former American football placekicker in the National Football League (NFL) from 1973–1982 for the Atlanta Falcons, Philadelphia Eagles, and the Buffalo Bills. He made the Pro Bowl in his rookie year. He later played with the San Antonio Gunslingers of the United States Football League (USFL).  His brother Steve Mike-Mayer also played in the NFL.  Mike-Mayer would later go on to play in the Arena Football League (AFL) for the Chicago Bruisers and Los Angeles Cobras, earning All-Arena honors in 1987.

Mike-Mayer's father had played soccer in Hungary and left with his family to escape Communism, ending up in Italy, where Mike-Mayer was born. The family emigrated to the United States and settled in Passaic, New Jersey, where he played football at Passaic High School.

References

External links
Just Sports Stats

1950 births
Living people
American football placekickers
American people of Hungarian descent
Atlanta Falcons players
Buffalo Bills players
Chicago Bruisers players
Los Angeles Cobras players
National Conference Pro Bowl players
Passaic High School alumni
Philadelphia Eagles players
Players of American football from New Jersey
San Antonio Gunslingers players
Sportspeople from Passaic, New Jersey
Temple Owls football players
Italian emigrants to the United States